Gložane may refer to:

 Gložane (Svilajnac), a village in Serbia
 Gložane (Vlasotince), a village in Serbia